Kin is a Singapore drama series produced by Mediacorp. It stars Ariati Tyeb Papar, Jasmine Sim, Sofia Dendroff, Rachel Wan, Margaret Lim, Sue Tan, Maxi Lim, Ebi Shankara, Carla Dunareanu, Gayathri Segaran, Mastura Ahmad, Hatta Said, and Jason Godfrey.

Kin premiered on 1 October 2018 on Mediacorp Channel 5, with a repeat telecast at 12am and 1.30pm the following weekday.
The last episode aired on 31 March 2022 at 8.30pm as announced on 7 January 2022.

Story 
23 years ago, two baby girls, Ella (Jasmine Sim) and Yoke (Rachel Wan) were switched at birth. It was not an accident. Their mothers Loh May Wan (Margaret Lim) and Jessica Shelley (Sue Tan), rivals from primary school, attempt to unravel the truth behind the baby swap as they grapple with their birth-daughters who are their polar opposites in every way.

Deanna (Gayathri Segaren) finds out that she is terminally ill. She decides to entrust her husband, Kenneth (Ebi Shankara), to her best friend Ananya (Carla Dunareanu). Now, Ananya has to choose between James (Jason Godfrey), a man whom she has always admired, and Kenneth. Meanwhile, as dutiful wife Rosnani (Ariati Tyeb Papar) is tending to her boss and mother-in-law Adina's (Mastura Ahmad) orders at their family restaurant, her husband Zaryn (Hatta Said) is rendezvousing with his boss Syirah (Adlina Adil). Rosnani's life revolves around her family and now, her world is about to shatter.

Cast

Episodes

Music
The theme song "Save Me From Myself" for this series is written by Singaporean singer songwriter and producer Serene Koong.

Special episodes 
In June 2020, Mediacorp and social storytelling platform Wattpad organised a Kin fan fiction writing contest. They received 133 entries from Singapore and other countries. Four entries out of the winning entries were adopted and filmed by Mediacorp as spin-off episodes.

The four episodes, of 30 minutes each, are not related to the KIN storylines but of alternate stories if certain characters had made different choices. The episodes were shown on MeWATCH on 17 December 2020 and shown on Channel 5 weekly from 8 February 2021.

References

Singaporean television series
2018 Singaporean television series debuts
Channel 5 (Singapore) original programming